Patrick "Pat" Kirkwood (December 22, 1927 in Fort Worth, Texas – February 9, 2001) was a NASCAR Grand National Driver from 1949 to 1957.

Career

As a driver
He competed in the first season of what is now known as the NASCAR Sprint Cup Series. On average, Kirkwood started and finished a race in 15th place with total career earnings of $3290 ($ when adjusted for inflation). In 1956, Kirkwood finished 56th in the entire season's championship standings. However, he did worse in 1957 with a final result of 178th in that season's championship standings. Although Kirkwood never won a race or a championship, Kirkwood competed in NASCAR during its unregulated and highly unsponsored era. Funding for teams and drivers was so sparse back then that none of the teams could race in all eight races of the 1949 NASCAR Strictly Stock season.

As an owner
Kirkwood was also briefly a NASCAR owner who had his vehicles race in one race in the 1949 season in addition to four races in the 1952 season. With an average start of 14th and an average finish of 15th, Kirkwood's vehicles had an average finish for the time.

References

External links
 

1927 births
2001 deaths
NASCAR drivers
NASCAR team owners
Sportspeople from Fort Worth, Texas
Racing drivers from Texas
Racing drivers from Fort Worth, Texas